Claire Edmondson is a filmmaker. She was born in Liverpool, England and grew up in Canada.

Career 
In February 2011, Austra released their first music video "Beat and the Pulse" directed by Edmondson. The dark, sexy video featured women of different shapes and sizes, some with (silicon) mutations dancing in a dark basement after-hours type space.The video for "Beat and the Pulse" that was censored by YouTube. Full of topless dancers, the video showcases a woman in control of her sexuality.

Sweetest Kill video and controversy 
The music video for Broken Social Scene's Sweetest Kill (June 2011), A dark take on love gone wrong, the video featured Bijou Phillips lovingly chopping up her boyfriend and burying him in a rose garden.  Certain critics wrote of its importance.

The Sweetest Kill video was banned in Canada. "The video was in part funded by MuchFACT, a production fund provided by Canadian music television stations MuchMusic and MuchMore, though both stations ended up banning it due to its content." Edmondson was quoted as saying "After that video a lot of videos came out with dudes killing people and no one was disturbed by them. But because [the Sweetest Kill video] was a feminine take on killing, it really disturbed people."

Broken Social Scene's "Sweetest Kill" and Austra's "Beat and the Pulse" were named 2 of the top ten NSFW (not suitable for work) videos of 2011 by Stereogum. "Claire Edmondson, the director, also did Broken Social Scene's "Sweetest Kill" video, proving that she can do a few entirely different forms of disturbing."

Edmondson collaborated with Austra again, making a film protesting Russia's imprisonment of the band Pussy Riot. In the film, Stelmanis sets herself on fire in protest. The film was shown at the Tribeca Film Festival as a part of the inaugural NOW program.

Commercial work 
Everlast's 'I'm a Boxer' video was released in January 2015. Edmonsen made the video as a response to sexism in sports". Everlast recently launched their new ad which follows a young female boxer into the ring, aiming to destroy sexism in the sport.

While talking about the sexism in the advertising industry she stated: "If men can direct tampon commercials surely women can direct beer commercials".

In 2016 Edmondson was shortlisted for a Young Director Award in the category, Broadcast, Northern America  on Leo Burnett's "Own It" campaign for Special K.

References

Year of birth missing (living people)
Living people
Canadian music video directors